Indonesia participated in the 1970 Asian Games held in Bangkok, Thailand from August 24, 1970 to September 4, 1970.
It was ranked ninth in medal count, with two gold, five silver, and thirteen bronze medals, making a total of twenty in all.

Medal summary

Medal table

Medalists

References

Nations at the 1970 Asian Games
1970